, ᶑ (d with hook and tail) is a letter of the Latin alphabet, used in phonetic transcription to represent a voiced retroflex implosive, though it is not explicitly part of the International Phonetic Alphabet. It is formed from d with the addition of a hook to mark it as implosive, and a tail to mark it as retroflex.

Computer encoding

 was added to Unicode with version 4.1 in 2005, but very few fonts display it.

There is no standard Unicode encoding for the capital form. Alternatively, combining characters can also represent the uppercase ᶑ (like Ɗ̢).

Latin-script letters
Phonetic transcription symbols